Mohamed Slim Ben Othman (born 18 November 1989) is a Tunisian professional footballer who played as a midfielder for Club Africain.

Club career
Ben Othman joined Ligue 2 side Angers SCO in 2014. He made his debut for the team a few weeks later, scoring the first goal in a 2–2 draw against Metz in March 2014.

On 12 October 2016, Ben Othman joined Bulgarian club Lokomotiv Gorna Oryahovitsa. Following the relegation to Second League, he bought out his contract and left the club in June 2017.

In June 2017, Ben Othman signed with Ligue 2 club Orléans.

References

External links
Profile at Soccerway

1989 births
Living people
Footballers from Tunis
Association football midfielders
Tunisian footballers
Tunisian expatriate footballers
Expatriate footballers in Ukraine
Tunisian expatriate sportspeople in Ukraine
Expatriate footballers in Portugal
Tunisian expatriate sportspeople in Portugal
Expatriate footballers in Bulgaria
Tunisian expatriate sportspeople in Bulgaria
Ligue 2 players
Liga Portugal 2 players
First Professional Football League (Bulgaria) players
AS Ariana players
Stade Tunisien players
CS M'saken players
CS Sfaxien players
FC Metalurh Zaporizhzhia players
Angers SCO players
Leixões S.C. players
FC Lokomotiv Gorna Oryahovitsa players
US Orléans players
Club Africain players